How to Sleep When You're on Fire is an EP by Canadian singer-songwriter Lights. The album was released on June 11, 2020 on Bandcamp. All proceeds of this album will go to Black Lives Matter Vancouver. Lights stated: "I made a night-time instrumental synthwave album over the last few weeks of sleeplessness. Loads of chill vibes. Kind of like an island cave, but with an arcade in it".

Reception
The Peak described the EP as "a vibey, instrumental space jam", while Blunt Magazine called it "synthwave for the soul".

Track listing

Personnel
All tracks are produced, mixed and mastered by Lights.

References

2020 albums
Black Lives Matter art
Charity albums
Lights (musician) albums
Self-released albums